Peter Smith (born 18 July 1937) is a Scottish former footballer who played as a defender. Beginning his career with Heart of Midlothian, Smith failed to make an appearance and moved to Dundee United in 1959, spending a single season at Tannadice. In 1960, Smith moved to Alloa, where he made around 300 appearances for The Wasps before being released in 1969. One of his most notable performances for Alloa was in the 1961–62 season against Queens Park. Losing 2–5 at half-time, Smith was moved from right back to centre forward and scored a second-half hat-trick. Alloa won the match 7–5.

External links 
 Alloa Athletic FC profile

1937 births
Scottish footballers
Scottish Football League players
Heart of Midlothian F.C. players
Dundee United F.C. players
Alloa Athletic F.C. players
Association football defenders
Livingston United F.C. players
Living people
Place of birth missing (living people)
Association football forwards